The Army of the Cumberland was one of the principal Union armies in the Western Theater during the American Civil War. It was originally known as the Army of the Ohio.

History

The origin of the Army of the Cumberland dates back to the creation of the Army of the Ohio in November 1861, under the command of Brig. Gen. Robert Anderson. The army fought under the name Army of the Ohio until Maj. Gen. William S. Rosecrans assumed command of the army and the Department of the Cumberland and changed the name of the combined entity to the Army of the Cumberland. When Rosecrans assumed command, the army and the XIV Corps were the same unit, divided into three "grand divisions" (wings) commanded by Alexander McCook (Right Wing), George H. Thomas (Center), and Thomas L. Crittenden (Left).

General Order No. 168 was the order passed by the Union Army on October 24, 1862, that called for commissioning the XIV Corps into the Army of the Cumberland.

The army's first significant combat under the Cumberland name was at the Battle of Stones River. After the battle the army and XIV Corps were separated. The former Center wing became XIV Corps, the Right wing became XX Corps, and the Left wing became XXI Corps. Rosecrans still retained command of the army. He next led it through the Tullahoma Campaign and at the Battle of Chickamauga, after which the army became besieged at Chattanooga. Maj. Gen. Ulysses S. Grant arrived at Chattanooga. Reinforcements from the Army of the Potomac and the Army of the Tennessee also arrived. Rosecrans had been a popular and respected commander, but because of his defeat at Chickamauga and inability to lift the Confederate siege, Grant chose to replace him with George H. Thomas on October 19, 1863.

In the Battles for Chattanooga, Grant had been leery of using the Army of the Cumberland in the main fighting, fearing their morale to be too low after the defeat at Chickamauga. Instead, he used the veterans from the Army of the Potomac, proud of their recent victory at the Battle of Gettysburg, to take Lookout Mountain and planned to use the troops from the Army of the Tennessee, also recent victors at the Siege of Vicksburg, to attack the Confederate right flank on Missionary Ridge. The Army of the Cumberland was given the minor task of seizing the rifle pits at the base of Missionary Ridge. However, once they achieved their objective, four divisions (one led by Philip H. Sheridan) stormed up the ridge and routed the Confederate center. When Grant angrily asked who had ordered those troops up the ridge both Thomas and Gordon Granger, a corps commander in the army, responded they did not know. Granger then added, "Once those boys get started, all hell can't stop 'em."

After Grant's victory at Chattanooga earned him promotion to general-in-chief of the U.S. Army, Maj. Gen. William T. Sherman assumed command of Grant's Military Division of the Mississippi, which controlled all Union armies in the West. He created an "army group" of the Army of the Cumberland, the Army of the Tennessee, and the Army of the Ohio and marched towards Atlanta in May 1864. On the way to Atlanta they fought in many battles and skirmishes including the Battle of Kennesaw Mountain. In September, Atlanta fell to Sherman's army group. When Confederate general John B. Hood moved north from Atlanta, Sherman chose not to follow him and instead dispatched some of the Army of the Cumberland (IV Corps and Provisional Detachment) and the Army of the Ohio (XXIII Corps) after him. Thomas finally met Hood at the Battle of Nashville and crushed him, thus bringing to an end any significant military actions for the Army of the Cumberland. Other elements of the Army of the Cumberland (the XIV and XX Corps) marched to the sea and north through the Carolinas with Sherman, under the command of Maj. Gen. Henry W. Slocum. These forces became the Union's Army of Georgia and participated in the Grand Review of the Armies in Washington, D.C., before President Andrew Johnson in 1865.

Command history

Orders of battle
 Stones River Union order of battle
 Chickamauga Union order of battle
 Chattanooga-Ringgold Campaign Union order of battle
 Atlanta Campaign Union order of battle
 Peachtree Creek Union order of battle
 Nashville Union order of battle

References
 Eicher, John H., and David J. Eicher. Civil War High Commands. Stanford, CA: Stanford University Press, 2001. .
Organization of U.S. Forces in the Civil War

Further reading
 Daniel, Larry J. Days of Glory: The Army of the Cumberland, 1861–1865. Baton Rouge: Louisiana State University Press, 2004. .
 Hunt, Robert Eno. The Good Men Who Won the War: Army of the Cumberland Veterans and Emancipation Memory. Tuscaloosa: University of Alabama Press, 2010. .
 Prokopowicz, Gerald J. All for the Regiment: The Army of the Ohio, 1861–1862. Chapel Hill: University of North Carolina Press, 2001. .
 Van Horne, Thomas B. The Army of the Cumberland: Its Organizations, Campaigns, and Battles. New York: Smithmark Publishers, 1996. . First published 1885 by Robert Clarke & Co.
 Cist, Henry M. The Army of the Cumberland. Edison, NY, Castle Books, . First Published 1882, Cist, a general in the army, is considered the definitive work on the Army of the Cumberland.

External links
 
 Army Organization during the Civil War
 

Cumberland, Army of the
Kentucky in the American Civil War
Tennessee in the American Civil War
William Rosecrans
1862 establishments in the United States
Military units and formations established in 1862
Military units and formations disestablished in 1865
1865 disestablishments in the United States